Sleagill is a civil parish in the Eden District, Cumbria, England.  It contains two listed buildings that are recorded in the National Heritage List for England.  Both the listed buildings are designated at Grade II, the lowest of the three grades, which is applied to "buildings of national importance and special interest".  The parish contains the village of Sleagill, and is otherwise rural.  The listed buildings consist of two farmhouses, one with an attached farm building.


Buildings

References

Citations

Sources

Lists of listed buildings in Cumbria